Bijan Jalali (1927  – January 2000) was a modern Persian poet.

Jalali was born in Tehran, Iran. His works include: The Color of Water, Days, Dailies, Our Heart and the World, Play of Light, and The Water and the Sun.

See also

 Nima Yooshij
 Persian literature

References 

 نگاهی به جهان شاعرانه‌ی بیژن جلالی 

Persian-language poets
20th-century Iranian poets
1927 births
2000 deaths
20th-century poets